Richard Southwell Bourke, 6th Earl of Mayo,  (21 February 1822 – 8 February 1872) styled Lord Naas from 1842 to 1867 and Lord Mayo in India, was a British statesman and prominent member of the British Conservative Party who served as Chief Secretary for Ireland (1852, 1858–9, 1866–8) and Viceroy of India (1869–72).

Background and education
Mayo was born in Dublin, Ireland, the eldest son of Robert Bourke, 5th Earl of Mayo (the son of Hon. Richard Burke, Bishop of Waterford and Lismore), and his wife, Anne Charlotte, daughter of the Hon. John Jocelyn. His younger brother the Hon. Robert Bourke was also a successful politician. He was educated at Trinity College, Dublin. He and his brothers were accomplished horsemen and enjoyed fox hunting.

Political career

After travelling in Russia, Mayo was elected MP for Kildare (1847–52), Coleraine (1852–7) and Cockermouth (1857–68). He was thrice appointed Chief Secretary for Ireland – in 1852, 1858 and 1866 – and in 1869 he became the fourth Viceroy of India where he was locally often referred to as "Lord Mayo". He consolidated the frontiers of India and reorganised the country's finances; he also did much to promote irrigation, railways, forests and other useful public works. To solve local problems he established local boards. During his tenure the first census took place in 1872. He founded Mayo College at Ajmer for the education of young Indian chiefs, with £70,000 being subscribed by the chiefs themselves.

Assassination
While visiting the convict settlement at Port Blair in the Andaman Islands in 1872 for the purpose of inspection, he was assassinated by Sher Ali Afridi, a former Afghan soldier who was later convicted of murdering a relative in an argument who had become disgruntled. He vowed to kill a senior official in revenge. Mayo's body was brought home to Ireland and buried at the medieval ruined church in Johnstown, County Kildare, near his home at Palmerstown House. Afridi was hanged on March 11, 1872.

Memorials

Lord Mayo March 
The traditional Irish march "Lord Mayo" (Tiagharna Mhaighe-eo) was named after him; according to tradition, it was composed by his harper David Murphy to appease Mayo after Murphy angered him.

Papilio mayo Butterfly 
In 1873, the newly discovered swallowtail butterfly Papilio mayo from the Andaman Islands was named in his honour.

St Paul's Cathedral
A Memorial to Lord Mayo is in the third recess of the South Wall at St Paul's Cathedral, London.

Statue in Cockermouth, Cumbria

On 19 August 1875, a statue of Lord Mayo was unveiled in the centre of the main street in the town of Cockermouth.  The 800-guinea cost of the statue (made by Messrs. Willis of London) had been raised by public subscription. The unveiling was attended by Mayo's son, the 7th Earl; Lord Napier and Ettrick; Harvey Goodwin, Bishop of Carlisle; and the Earl of Lonsdale. The statue, carved in Sicilian marble, depicts Lord Mayo in his viceregal garb, and still stands today.

Mayo Hospital, Lahore, Pakistan
Mayo Hospital is one of the oldest and biggest hospitals in Lahore, Punjab, Pakistan. The hospital is named after then Viceroy of British India, "Richard Bourke, 6th Earl of Mayo" also locally known as Lord Mayo.

Statue at Albert Hall Museum, Jaipur, India 
A statue of Lord Mayo had been installed in the premises of Mayo Hospital (currently known as the Mahilya Chikatsalya, Jaipur). The  cast-iron statue, weighing around 3 tons, was ordered sculpted by the Maharaja Ram Singh ji of Jaipur, as a tribute to Lord Mayo after his assassination. The sculptors were J. Forsyth and R. Monti. The company's name as inscribed on the statue was R. Masefield & Co., London. 

This statue of Lord Mayo had been buried in the premises of the Albert Hall Museum of Jaipur at the time of the independence of India in 1947 to prevent vandalism. After six decades, this statue was unearthed by the Jaipur Mayo Alumni Chapter on 29 May 2007. It was later removed from the Albert Hall Museum in Jaipur and sent to Mayo College, in Ajmer, India, where it is now installed.

Mayo College, Ajmer, India 
Mayo College, Ajmer, India, was founded after the death of Lord Mayo in 1875. The College, named in honour of Lord Mayo, already had a full life-size statue of him sculpted in white marble installed in front of its famous main building since inception and a marble sculpted bust of him in its school museum. The College accepted the statue of Lord Mayo which was unearthed at Mayo Hospital, Jaipur in 2007.

Family
Lord Mayo married Blanche Julia, daughter of George Wyndham, 1st Baron Leconfield, in 1848. He was succeeded in the earldom by his eldest son, Dermot. Lady Mayo died in 1918.

Arms

See also
 Mayo College, Ajmer, India
 Mayo Hall, Allahabad, India
 Mayo Hall, Bangalore, India
 Mayo School of Arts, Lahore, British India
 Viceroy of India
 Mayo Hospital, Lahore, Pakistan

Notes

References

Kidd, Charles, Williamson, David (editors). Debrett's Peerage and Baronetage (1990 edition). New York: St Martin's Press, 1990, 
Encyclopædia Britannica Article on Richard Southwell Bourke, 6th earl of Mayo
Obituary & Photo at the Mayo College, Ajmer, India website

External links
 

 
 The assassination of Lord Mayo: The 'first' jihad?

Viceroys of India
1860s in British India
1870s in British India
Founders of Indian schools and colleges
1822 births
1872 deaths
Alumni of Trinity College Dublin
Assassinated British politicians
British people murdered abroad
Cumbria MPs
Irish Anglicans
Knights of St Patrick
Irish knights
Knights Grand Commander of the Order of the Star of India
Members of the Parliament of the United Kingdom for English constituencies
Members of the Parliament of the United Kingdom for County Londonderry constituencies (1801–1922)
Members of the Parliament of the United Kingdom for County Kildare constituencies (1801–1922)
Politicians from County Dublin
People murdered in India
UK MPs 1847–1852
UK MPs 1852–1857
UK MPs 1857–1859
UK MPs 1859–1865
UK MPs 1865–1868
UK MPs who inherited peerages
Deaths by stabbing in India
Richard
Members of the Privy Council of the United Kingdom
Members of the Privy Council of Ireland
Chief Secretaries for Ireland
Earls of Mayo
1872 murders in India